A tether is a cord, fixture, or flexible attachment that secures something movable to something else.

Tether may also refer to:

Science and technology
 Tether (cell biology), an elongated cylinder of the membrane of a cell bond to a substrate
 Molecular tether

Computing
 Tethering, sharing a mobile device's internet connection
 Tether (cryptocurrency), a cryptocurrency
 Tethered jailbreak, in iOS jailbreaking

Space
 Space tether, use of tethers to propel or stabilize objects in space
 Electrodynamic tether, a conductive space tether which generates current and acts against a planetary magnetic field
 Momentum exchange tether, a kind of space tether
 Skyhook (structure), or a tidal stabilized tether
 Space elevator, a geostationary orbital tether

Songs
 "Tether" (song), by Eric Prydz, 2015
 "Tether", by Chvrches from The Bones of What You Believe, 2013
 "Tether", by Damien Jurado from Where Shall You Take Me?, 2003
 "Tether", by Dreamers of the Ghetto from Enemy/Lover, 2011
 "Tether", by the Indigo Girls from All That We Let In, 2004
 "Tether", by On Broken Wings from Number One Beautiful, 2001
 "Tether", by Plaid from Reachy Prints, 2014
 "Tether", by Sarah Harmer from All of Our Names, 2004
 "Tether", by Tantric from Mercury Retrograde, 2018

Other uses
 Ankle monitor or tether, used to track parolees' whereabouts and/or alcohol use
 Tether (hieroglyph), an alphabetic uniliteral sign of ancient Egypt
 Anthony Tether (born ca. 1941), Director of the Defense Advanced Research Projects Agency

See also
 Tethersonde, a radiosonde attached to a fixed or tethered balloon
 Teather (disambiguation)
 Mind at the End of Its Tether, a book by H.G. Wells
 Tying (disambiguation)